Paddock is an unincorporated community in Holt County, Nebraska, United States.

History
A post office was established at Paddock in the 1870s. It was named for Algernon Paddock, a U.S. Senator from Nebraska. Paddock was the county seat of Holt County from 1876 to 1879.

References

Unincorporated communities in Holt County, Nebraska
Unincorporated communities in Nebraska